Kurt Sucksdorff (10 May 1904 – 1 January 1960) was a Swedish ice hockey goaltender who won a silver medal at the 1928 Winter Olympics. He was a backup for Nils Johansson and therefore played only two matches. At the 1931 World Championships he played all six matches and achieved a scoreless draw against Canada, yet his team placed sixth.

Sucksdorff won Swedish titles with IK Göta in 1928-30.

References

1904 births
1960 deaths
Swedish ice hockey goaltenders
Ice hockey players at the 1928 Winter Olympics
Olympic silver medalists for Sweden
Olympic ice hockey players of Sweden
Olympic medalists in ice hockey
Medalists at the 1928 Winter Olympics
IFK Stockholm Ishockey players
IK Göta Ishockey players
Ice hockey people from Stockholm